Candles Convoy of Salé, also called Moussem of Candles or wax procession, is a festival in Salé, Morocco. It is organised once every year during the period of Mawlid (birth of prophet Muhammad).

History 
During the reign of Ahmed al-Mansour between 1578 and 1603, the Sultan was impressed by a convoy of candles in celebration of the Mawlid during his exile (between 1557 à 1576) to Istanbul. The Sultan decided to imitate this Ottoman celebration and bring it to Marrakech. He ordered to have candle convoys in all parts of the kingdom including Salé. This tradition continued around Salé for many centuries.

Moroccans parade carrying large, colorful candles, which they then place at the foot of the mausoleum Sidi Abdellah ben Hassoun.

See also 
 Salé
 Culture of Morocco
 List of festivals in Morocco

References 

Festivals in Morocco
Salé